Waskish Township is a township in Beltrami County, Minnesota, United States. The population was 116 as of the 2000 census, primarily in the community of Waskish (pronounced was'kish).  The community is notable as the only settlement on either Upper or Lower Red Lake not within the boundaries of Red Lake Indian Reservation.

It is the location of Big Bog State Recreation Area.

Waskish is derived from the Ojibwe-language word meaning "deer".

Geography
According to the United States Census Bureau, the township has a total area of 72.0 square miles (186.5 km), of which 65.0 square miles (168.4 km) is land and 7.0 square miles (18.1 km) (9.69%) is water. Nearby is the Big Bog State Recreation Area and Upper Red Lake.

Unincorporated towns
 Domaas at 
 Waskish at 
(This list is based on USGS data and may include former settlements.)

Major highways
  Minnesota State Highway 72

Lakes
 Larson Lake
 Norman Lake
 Upper Red Lake (east edge)

Adjacent townships
 Shotley Township (southwest)

Demographics
As of the census of 2000, there were 116 people, 61 households, and 35 families residing in the township. The population density was 1.8 people per square mile (0.7/km). There were 313 housing units at an average density of 4.8/sq mi (1.9/km). The racial makeup of the township was 95.69% White, 2.59% African American, 0.86% Native American, and 0.86% from two or more races.

There were 61 households, out of which 9.8% had children under the age of 18 living with them, 52.5% were married couples living together, 3.3% had a female householder with no husband present, and 42.6% were non-families. 41.0% of all households were made up of individuals, and 16.4% had someone living alone who was 65 years of age or older. The average household size was 1.90 and the average family size was 2.49.

In the township the population was spread out, with 10.3% under the age of 18, 5.2% from 18 to 24, 12.9% from 25 to 44, 44.0% from 45 to 64, and 27.6% who were 65 years of age or older. The median age was 58 years. For every 100 females, there were 123.1 males. For every 100 females age 18 and over, there were 112.2 males.

The median income for a household in the township was $25,000, and the median income for a family was $29,750. Males had a median income of $17,813 versus $52,500 for females. The per capita income for the township was $19,489. There were 12.8% of families and 26.8% of the population living below the poverty line, including 77.8% of under eighteens and 5.7% of those over 64.

References
 United States National Atlas
 United States Census Bureau 2007 TIGER/Line Shapefiles
 United States Board on Geographic Names (GNIS)

Townships in Beltrami County, Minnesota
Townships in Minnesota